"Homophones" is a word game in which a player creates a sentence or phrase containing a pair or larger set of homophones, substitutes another (usually nonsensical) pair of words for the homophone pair, then reads the newly created sentence out loud. The object of the game is for the other players to deduce what the original homophone pair is. The first person to correctly identify the secret homophones "wins" for that sentence and creates a new homophone puzzle. 

Like the word game "Ghost", this game is often played on long car rides with multiple people.

Gameplay Example
The player creating the puzzle first thinks of a pair of homophones, such as "tax" and "tacks," then places the words into a coherent sentence. For this example, the player decides the sentence will be, "George had to pay a sales tax when he bought a box of tacks." The player then chooses a word to substitute for both homophones in the homophone pair. Let us say that he chooses the word "chicken". He then says aloud to the other players,

"George had to pay a sales chicken when he bought a box of chicken."

The player that created the sentence then tells the other players which pair of identical words, in this case "chicken", has replaced the homophone pair. The other players then try to think of the correct homophone pair.

Humour
"Homophones" allows for, and in fact necessitates, the generous use of humour. The freedom to substitute any word for the homophones lets players create a wacky sentence or phrase, not unlike the game Madlibs.

Word games